Vice Admiral Patricio Carvajal Prado (16 July 1916 – 15 July 1994), was a Chilean admiral, several times Minister and one of the principal leaders of the 1973 Chilean coup d'état that ousted President Salvador Allende.

Military career
He joined the navy in 1931, where he was a classmate of future Admiral José Toribio Merino, and together they were commissioned as ensigns in 1935. In 1941, he was promoted to lieutenant; in 1950, to captain and in 1955, to commander. Carvajal was an artillery specialist. In 1958, he was commissioned to study anti-submarine warfare. In 1960, was the commander of the training-ship Esmeralda. In 1966, was designed as Naval Attache to London. Since 1967, he was the Navy Chief of Staff. In 1973, he was the Armed Forces General Chief of Staff.

Cabinet minister
Following the coup, he was appointed as Minister of Defense in 1973 and again from 1983 to 1990. He was also Chilean Minister of Foreign Affairs from 1974 to 1978. Carvajal committed suicide after a long bout with cancer.

References

External links
Christian, Shirley (July 14, 1986) Helms, In Chile, Denounces U.S. Envoy. New York Times
List of Defense Ministers of Chile

1916 births
1994 deaths
Arturo Prat Naval Academy alumni
Foreign ministers of Chile
Chilean Ministers of Defense
Chilean admirals
People from Santiago
Suicides by firearm in Chile
Naval attachés
20th-century Chilean Navy personnel